Kaloplocamus is a genus of sea slugs, specifically nudibranchs, shell-less marine gastropod molluscs in the family Polyceridae.

It contains bioluminescent species.

Species 
Species in the genus Kaloplocamus include:
 Kaloplocamus acutus Baba, 1949 
 Kaloplocamus dokte Vallès & Gosliner, 2006
 Kaloplocamus gulo (Marcus, 1979)
 Kaloplocamus maculatus (Bergh, 1898)
 Kaloplocamus maru Vallès & Gosliner, 2006
 Kaloplocamus pacificus (Bergh, 1884)
 Kaloplocamus peludo Vallès & Gosliner, 2006
 Kaloplocamus ramosus (Cantraine, 1835)
 Kaloplocamus yatesi (Angas, 1864)
Species brought into synonymy
 Kaloplocamus atlanticus (Bergh, 1892): synonym of Kaloplocamus ramosus (Cantraine, 1835)
 Kaloplocamus aureus Odhner, 1932: synonym of Kaloplocamus ramosus (Cantraine, 1835)
 Kaloplocamus filosus Cattaneo-Vietti & Sordi, 1988: synonym of Kaloplocamus ramosus (Cantraine, 1835)

References

 Vaught, K.C. (1989). A classification of the living Mollusca. American Malacologists: Melbourne, FL (USA). . XII, 195 pp.

External links
 Philippi R. A. (1836). Enumeratio molluscorum Siciliae cum viventium tum in tellure tertiaria fossilium, quae in itinere suo observavit. Vol. 1. Schropp, Berlin
 Bergh, L. S. R. (1880). Beitrage zu einer Monographie der Polyceraden. Verhandlungen der Kaiserlich-Königlichen Zoologisch-Botanischen Gesellschaft in Wien. 29: 599-652, pl. 9-14
 Oliver W.R.B. (1915) The Mollusca of the Kermadec Islands. Transactions and Proceedings of the New Zealand Institute, 47, 509–568, pls. 9–12.

Polyceridae
Bioluminescent molluscs